Edward Mansell FRIBA (c. 1861 – 11 March 1941) was an architect based in Birmingham.

Career

He was a pupil of J Barnsley and Sons, and then articled to his father, Thomas Henry Mansell. He was made Fellow of the Royal Institute of British Architects in 1908.

His main office was 47 Temple Row, Birmingham. He was in independent practice from 1887, and in partnership with his brother, Thomas Gildart Mansell, and Dixon.

He was Diocesan Surveyor for Birmingham and Coventry.

New buildings
Shop premises, 86 Digbeth, Birmingham, 1890
St Luke's Church, Bristol Street, Birmingham, 1903
King Edward VII Memorial Sanatorium adjacent to Central Hospital, Hatton

Alterations and restorations

Enlargement of Central Hospital, Hatton, c. 1893
Repairs to All Saints’ Church, Leamington Spa, 1908
Christ Church, Leamington Spa (church demolished 1959)
Home for Incurables, Leamington Spa, 1936

References

20th-century English architects
1941 deaths
Fellows of the Royal Institute of British Architects
Architects from Birmingham, West Midlands